Oded Kotler (born 5 May 1937) is an Israeli actor and theatre director. He is best known for his role in the film Three Days and a Child (1967), for which he received the Cannes Film Festival Award for Best Actor and a nomination for the Golden Globe Award for Most Promising Newcomer – Male.

Selected filmography
 Three Days and a Child (1967)
 Every Bastard a King (1968)
 My Michael (1976)

References

External links
 

1937 births
Living people
Israeli male film actors
Israeli male stage actors
Israeli male television actors
Israeli theatre directors
20th-century Israeli male actors
21st-century Israeli male actors
People from Tel Aviv
Cannes Film Festival Award for Best Actor winners